Carla Renee McGhee (born March 6, 1968 in Peoria, Illinois) is an American former basketball player most notable for her career at the University of Tennessee.  She was injured in a car crash in 1987 and was in a coma for 47 hours, suffering brain injuries and breaking nearly every bone in her face.  She was told she'd never play again.  She was a member of the gold medal-winning 1996 Olympic Team.

As a member of the Tennessee Lady Volunteers, McGhee won two national championships at Tennessee (1987 and 1989) in three-tournament appearances.  She averaged 6.1 points per game and 5.1 rebounds per game for her collegiate career. She was named to the 1987 Tennessean All-Freshman team.

She played one season in the ABL for the Atlanta Glory, averaging 8.2 points per game and 5.3 rebounds per game in 26 games. She has played six pro seasons abroad in Germany (1990–91, 1998), Spain (1991–93) and Italy (1993–95).  McGhee was a Spanish League and Spanish/Italian League All-Star in 1993.

She played for the Orlando Miracle in the WNBA from 1999 to 2002.

USA Basketball
McGhee was named to the team representing the US at the 1987 William Jones Cup competition in Taipei, Taiwan. The team won all seven games to win the gold medal for the event. The USA was down at halftime in the opening game against Japan, but came back in the second half to win, helped by 15 points from Campbell. McGhee averaged 7.4 points per game over the seven games.

McGhee was selected to be a member of the USA team invited to the 1994 World Championships. The preliminary rounds were held in Hobart, Tasmania while the final rounds were in Sydney, Australia. The USA team won their first six games before playing Brazil in the semi-final match up. Brazil's Hortência Marcari had a great game scoring 32 points, and the final score of 110–107 favored the Brazilian team. The USA team regrouped to beat the host Australia team 100–95 to take home the bronze medal. McGhee averaged 5.3 points per game.

McGhee was selected to represent the US at the 1995 USA Women's Pan American Games, however, only four teams committed to participate, so the event was cancelled.

McGhee's final event as a member of the USA team was the 1996 Olympics, held in Atlanta, Georgia USA. The USA team won all their pool play games by large margins, although they were behind Cuba by as much as seven points before Lisa Leslie's 24 points, helped the USA take over the game. The USA victory over Australia featured a record setting 15 assists by Teresa Edwards, while Johnson was the leading scorer with 24 points. Against Japan, Lisa Leslie set a USA Olympic scoring record with 35 points. In the final, the USA team faced 7–0 Brazil—a team that had beaten the USA squad in the 1991 Pan Am games and the 1994 World Championships. This time, playing before a home crowd of 32,987, the USA team started out very strong, hitting 71.9 per cent of their field goals leading to an eleven points margin at the half. The USA team scored the first eight points of the second half and won the gold medal 111–87. McGhee averaged 3.1 points per game.

References

1968 births
Living people
African-American basketball players
American expatriate basketball people in Germany
American expatriate basketball people in Greece
American expatriate basketball people in Italy
American expatriate basketball people in Spain
American women's basketball players
Atlanta Glory players
Basketball players at the 1996 Summer Olympics
Basketball players from Illinois
Goodwill Games medalists in basketball
Medalists at the 1996 Summer Olympics
Olympic gold medalists for the United States in basketball
Orlando Miracle players
Panathinaikos WBC players
Parade High School All-Americans (girls' basketball)
Small forwards
Sportspeople from Peoria, Illinois
Tennessee Lady Volunteers basketball players
Competitors at the 1994 Goodwill Games
United States women's national basketball team players